LeasePlan is an international company of Dutch origins, specialised in automobile leasing and fleet management.

Its products are composed of operational fleet management services. It was founded in 1963. It has more than 14% of its approximately 6,600 employees working out of the Netherlands.

The company is owned by LP Group B.V., a consortium including Stichting Pensioenfonds Zorg en Welzijn, Arbejdsmarkedets Tillægspension, GIC Private Limited, TDR Capital and Luxinva S.A. of the Abu Dhabi Investment Authority.

History 
Founded in the Netherlands in 1963 following a joint venture between a bank and a company providing services to drivers, LeasePlan initially specialised in the open-book management model (an actual costs management system). LeasePlan expanded internationally in the 1970s by establishing operations in Belgium, Germany, France, and Great Britain.

In 1985, the banking group ABN-Amro acquired 100% of the shares in LeasePlan and founded a holding company named ABN-Amro Lease Holding. LeasePlan diversified its offer by introducing an online fleet management software package (Plan8, now called FleetReporting).

Responding to the trend in market consolidation, LeasePlan acquired several companies in the years following 2000 (Dial in Great Britain, in France, and in Italy, and CSC in the United States).

Since 1993 the company holds a banking license.

In 2003, the holding company of the LeasePlan Group was renamed LeasePlan Corporation.

In 2004, ABN-Amro sold LeasePlan Corporation to a consortium consisting of the Volkswagen Group (50%), Olayan Group (25%), and Mubadala Development Company (25%). In 2009  German Metzler Bank took over the shares of the latter two companies.

In 2012 LeasePlan acquired the Italian car leasing activities of BBVA.

On 21 March 2016, an international consortium led by the Dutch Stichting Pensioenfonds Zorg en Welzijn pension fund completed its acquisition of the company. In 2017, the company announced it was exploring strategic alternatives for the business, that included a potential initial public offering (IPO). However the IPO was cancelled in October 2018, with no further plans to bring the company public.

On 6 January 2022 the French fleet rental and car leasing company ALD Automotive, the listed subsidiary of the French bank Société Générale announced an intention to acquire the company for 4.9 billion euros with closing of the transaction expected to happen by the end of the calendar year 2022.

International presence 

LeasePlan, present in over 30 countries, became the first company in the leasing industry to manage more than 1.8 million cars worldwide, and offer fleet management services. LeasePlan is present in both traditional and emerging markets.

Countries
The following is a list of countries where LeasePlan is established:

LeasePlan Europe
 Netherlands, France, Belgium, Luxembourg, United Kingdom, Ireland, Portugal, Spain, Denmark, Germany, Switzerland, Norway, Sweden, Finland, Austria, Slovakia, Czech Republic, Poland, Hungary, Greece, Italy, Romania and Turkey.

LeasePlan UK
LeasePlan UK was created in 1979. The company operates a fleet of over 137,000 vehicles including over 38,000 commercial vehicles.  Major clients include NHS, Virgin Media and Carlsberg. It also sells off-lease vehicles to wholesalers and through its new CarNext.com unit. Awards the company has earned include Fleet News leasing company of the year 2016 and Green Fleet leasing company of the year 2016.

LeasePlan America 
 United-States, Canada and Brazil

LeasePlan Asia 
 Russia, United Arab Emirates, and India

LeasePlan Oceania 
 Australia and New Zealand were sold to SG Fleet in 2021

LeasePlan Bank 
LeasePlan Bank is a Dutch internet savings bank and an undertaking of LeasePlan. LeasePlan Bank was established in 2010 to provide an additional source of financing for LeasePlan's core business.

References

External links
Official website
LeasePlan UK
LeasePlan Bank (in Dutch)

Leasing companies
Financial services companies established in 1963
Transport companies established in 1963
LeasePlan Bank